EFCA can stand for:
 The Evangelical Free Church of America, a group of evangelical Christian congregations in the United States
 The Employee Free Choice Act, proposed United States federal legislation
 The European Fisheries Control Agency, an agency of the European Union (EU) based in Vigo, Spain